James Bisse (c. 1552 – 1607), of Wells, Somerset, was an English politician.

He was a Member (MP) of the Parliament of England for Wells in 1584.

References

1522 births
1607 deaths
English MPs 1584–1585
People from Wells, Somerset